Nora Hamzawi (born 29 April 1983) is a French humorist, comedian, and columnist.

Biography
Nora Hamzawi is of Syrian origin by her mother. She was born in Cannes and grew up in Paris. After obtaining a baccalauréat, she enrolled in law school but gave up after three weeks. She then enrolled at IUT Paris Descartes in Infocom and completed her training at CELSA, section "marketing, advertising and communication". She follows in parallel with her studies Cours Florent and Atelier Fanny Vallon.

She goes on stage in 2009 with her first one-woman show. She was revealed to the public the same year by the festival Just for Laughs from Nantes. She is also writer for the series Scènes de ménages on M6.

She made a name for herself by appearing on Laurent Ruquier's On n'demande qu'à en rire on France 2 between 15 September 2011 and 19 March 2012, before being eliminated by an insufficient rating from the viewers (10/20). Jean Benguigui said of her: "She does not know how to move, she does not know how to play, she does not even know how to wear a dress!"

Between 2013 and 2015, she played the main role of Oh-Oh de Nora, a small humorous sequence integrated into Le Before du Grand Journal on Canal+. As of 2014, she is also a columnist in Le Grand Journal. After being the guest on TMC's Quotidien in October to present her show, Nora Hamzawi joins Yann Barthès' team on 1 December 2016 and hosts a column entitled "Nora a la réponse" in which she answers children's questions in a humorous way.

She is a radio columnist on France Inter from 2013 to 2017, in the show On va tous y passer then in La Bande originale.

Career

Shows alone on stage
2009: Nora One Woman Show, at the Théâtre Le Bout in Paris
2010: Le Show Inutile, at the theatre of La Loge in Paris
2012: Harmonie Hormonale, at La Comédie des Trois Bornes
Since 2013: Nora Hamzawi, throughout France

Filmography

Cinema
2012: Réussir sa vie of Benoît Forgeard
2013: The Rendez-Vous of Déjà-Vu of Antonin Peretjatko
2013: L'Ex de ma vie of Dorothée Sebbagh
2015: French Cuisine of Florent Emilio Siri
2017: Boule et Bill 2: The editor
2018: Non-Fiction of Olivier Assayas
2019: Alice and the Mayor
2020: Eleonore of Amro Hamzawi

Short films
2010: L'Antivirus of Benoît Forgeard, broadcast on France 2 on 27 Jun 2010
2011: Coloscopia of Benoît Forgeard, broadcast on France 2
2011: Les Secrets de l'invisible of Antonin Peretjatko

Television
2009–11: writer in Scènes de ménages broadcast on M6
2011–12: participant at On n'demande qu'à en rire, Laurent Ruquier's show on France 2
2013–15: humorous sequence "Oh-Oh de Nora" in Le Before du Grand Journal on Canal+
2013: plays her own role in the miniseries What Ze Teuf on C8
2014–15: columnist in Le Grand Journal, with Antoine de Caunes on Canal+
Since 2016: columnist in Quotidien, with Yann Barthès on TMC
2022 : Carla in Irma Vep on HBO

Radio
2013–14: columnist in On va tous y passer, with Frédéric Lopez on France Inter
2014–16: columnist in La Bande originale, with Nagui on France Inter

Bibliography

Books
"30 ans (10 ans de thérapie)", Mazarine, 2016,

Press
2014–17: weekly column in Grazia: Dans la tête de Nora Hamzawi

Distinctions
2012: Public's favourite at La Fontaine d'Argent's festival du rire in Aix-en-Provence
2013: SACD Prize at the "L'Humour en Capitales" Festival
2017: SACEM Grand Prix of humour

References

External links

1985 births
Living people
French actresses
French humorists
Radio France people
French columnists
Cours Florent alumni
People from Cannes
Women humorists
French women columnists
French people of Syrian descent